NUI as an acronym may refer to:

National University of Ireland
Natural User Interface
Normally unmanned installation

Nui may refer to:
Nui (atoll), a group of islands in Tuvalu
Nui (football club)
Nui, Iran, a village in West Azerbaijan Province

See also
Niue, a South Pacific island nation